Sergeant Richard George Desautels   was a United States Army corporal who was captured on December 1, 1950 at Sonchu by communist forces and not returned by North Korea at the end of the fighting of the Korean War.  More than half a century later, the People's Republic of China admitted that Sgt. Desautels died while in captivity in China, and that his remains were buried in Shenyang, China.

Early life
Richard Desautels was from Shoreham, Vermont.  After growing up on a farm, he joined the U.S. Army at age 17.  Originally stationed in Fort Lewis (near Tacoma, Washington), he was transferred to South Korea in August 1950 shortly after North Korea invaded the South.  Desautels had a brother, Rolland.

Army service in Korea
Desautels was assigned to A Company, 2nd Engineer Battalion, 2nd Infantry Division, when his unit was overrun by a Chinese assault near Kunu-ri, North Korea, on December 1, 1950.  At the time, he had attained the rank of corporal.

He was last seen alive at Camp 5 in Pyoktong, North Korea on August 7, 1953.

Return of war dead controversy
The Korean War Armistice Agreement was signed in 1953.  One of the provisions of the agreement was for all sides to return the bodies of soldiers from the opposing side by October 30, 1954, namely to the Korean Communication Zone (KCOMZ). This exchange was carried out as Op Plan 14-54, also known as Operation Glory.

The People's Republic of China had said no Americans were moved to Chinese territory from North Korea, however, authorities from the People's Republic of China gave Pentagon officials details about Desautels in a March 2003 meeting in Beijing contradicting their prior claim.  This was not released until 2008 because the information was kept confidential and was only released to the family.

There are reports that North Korea kept some American POWs after the war in retaliation for U.S. refusal to repatriate those American-held POWs who did not want to return.  Gen. Mark W. Clark, former American commander of U.S. forces during the war wrote that "we had solid evidence" that hundreds of American POWs were kept after the war, possibly to gain leverage to replace the Republic of China with the People's Republic of China as the holder of the United Nations seat for China.

Post-war POW
Communist reports are that Desautels became mentally ill and died on April 29, 1953.  He was buried in Shenyang, formerly known as Mukden.  That area has been cited as where prison(s) holding hundreds of American POWs were kept, possibly as a transfer point to bring them to Russia.

At least 19 reports from former POWs held with Desautels were made, stating that he was alive. Desautels spoke Chinese and had disputes with his Chinese captors. According to Chinese reports, he was buried but his body was reburied during a construction project and the location is not known.

Promotion
During his imprisonment, Desautels was promoted to the rank of sergeant.

See also
United States Senate Select Committee on POW/MIA Affairs
Eugene DeBruin

References

Further reading
 NORTHEAST ASIA First Supplement, 1945–1966, A UPA Collection, records of the U.S. State Department in the custody of the National Archives of the United States on matters relating to the Korean War, Japan in the post–World War II period, America’s Far Eastern policy, and the economic redevelopment of the war-torn region.
 Lucier, James P., Insight on the News, The servicemen we left behind - diplomatic politics and US POW/MIA's in China, North Korea, Vietnam, March 30, 1998

External links
http://www.federalnewsradio.com/?nid=78&sid=1425276
http://www.iht.com/articles/ap/2008/06/19/america/NA-GEn-US-China-POW-Revelation.php
http://korea50.army.mil/casualties/vermont_kias.html
https://abcnews.go.com/Politics/WireStory?id=5208986&page=4
http://www.azstarnet.com/sn/news/244615.php
http://www.kansascity.com/news/nation/story/671652.html
http://www.military.com/news/article/china-admits-taking-burying-us-pow.html?col=1186032325324
http://www.missingpresumeddead.com

1953 deaths
1932 births
United States Army personnel of the Korean War
American prisoners of war in the Korean War
United States Army soldiers
People from Shoreham, Vermont
American military personnel killed in the Korean War
Military personnel from Vermont